Aatami Tanttu (24 December 1887 – 26 December 1939) was a Finnish wrestler. He competed in the lightweight event at the 1912 Summer Olympics.

References

External links
 

1887 births
1939 deaths
People from Hirvensalmi
People from Mikkeli Province (Grand Duchy of Finland)
Finnish male sport wrestlers
Olympic wrestlers of Finland
Wrestlers at the 1912 Summer Olympics
Sportspeople from South Savo